Hest is the second studio album by Norwegian indie rock band Kakkmaddafakka. It was released on February 25, 2011.

Track listing
"Restless" – 2:57
"Your Girl" – 3:29
"Self-Esteem" – 3:48
"Make The First Move" – 3:24
"Is She" – 3:43
"Touching" – 3:05
"Heidelberg" – 3:10
"Gangsta" – 3:25
"Drø Sø" – 3:28

References

Kakkmaddafakka albums
2011 albums